Ayaan Ali Bangash (born 5 September 1979) is an Indian classical musician who plays the sarod. Khan is the son of Amjad Ali Khan and often performs with his older brother Amaan Ali Bangash, with whom he hosted the music talent show Sa Re Ga Ma. He has also released solo albums and collaborations with brother and father.

Early life and career
Ayaan Ali Bangash was born 5 September 1979 as the son of sarod player Amjad Ali Khan and Subhalakshmi Barua Khan, a classical dancer. His birth name was Bangash and he was born in at least the fifth generation of musicians; the Bangash lineage claims to have invented the sarod. Khan has an older brother, Amaan, and they were taught music by their father from a young age and later began to perform with their father on concert tours.

Ayaan Ali Bangash has performed with his father and brother since the late 1980s and performed at Carnegie Hall in 1997. He released his solo debut album of classical music in 1999. Khan hosted the music talent show Sa Re Ga Ma on Zee TV with his brother for three years in the early 2000s. In 2002, Khan and his brother wrote a book about their father, Abba: God's Greatest Gift To Us. Moksha, a 2005 album made in with Amaan and Amjad Ali Khan and released by Real World Records, was nominated for Grammy Award for Best Traditional World Music Album. The brothers released Reincarnation, an album of world fusion music, in 2006, and a thematic album, Mystic Dunes, in 2007, and toured internationally. They were awarded a Lycra Style Award from MTV India in 2006. Khan and his brother also sing, including on the 2007 tribute album Remembering Mahatma Gandhi. Khan joined his family to perform for the Parliament of India in 2007. In 2009, after working under a movie contract that forbade public appearances for a year, the brothers returned to making music when the production by Bollywood director J. P. Dutta was cancelled. They released a Sufi music album called Rang in 2012.
They also released a new album called Headwaters in October 2013.

Personal life
In 2008, Ayaan Ali Bangash married Neema Sharma, daughter of Indian film producer, actor, and director Romesh Sharma. On 1 August 2012, Neema Ali Bangash gave birth to twin boys, Zohaan Ali Bangash and Abeer Ali Bangash.

Discography

Solo
Raga Bageshwari (1999)
Footsteps (2000)
Raga Shree (2002)
Sonata (2005)
Chords of Devotion (2005)

Ayaan and Amaan Ali Bangash

Raga Puriya Kalyan, Rageshwari (2002)
Strings Attached (2006) - with Matthew Barley (cello)
Reincarnation (2006)
Mystic Dunes (2006)
Truth (2007)
Passion (2007)
Dreamz''' (2007)

Amjad, Ayaan, and Amaan Ali BangashSarod Ghar (2000)The Legendary LineageSarod Maestro Amjad Ali Khan - With Sons (2001)Sarod for Harmony - Live at Carnegie Hall (2002)Moksha (2004)Sarod Trilogy (2006)Remembering Mahatma Gandhi'' (2007)

Notes

n-[1]

Ayaan and Amaan Ali Khan dropped their family surname Bangash in 2006.

References

External links

1979 births
Hindustani instrumentalists
Indian television presenters
Living people
Indian people of Pashtun descent